The 2015–16 season was Real Madrid Club de Fútbol's 112th season in existence and the club's 85th consecutive season in the top flight of Spanish football. It covered a period from 1 July 2015 to 30 June 2016.

Under new manager Rafael Benítez, Real Madrid remained unbeaten in the league until a 3–2 loss at Sevilla on the matchday 11. Perhaps, his reign is best remembered by multiple lopsided wins achieved both in La Liga and the Champions League (6–0 vs Espanyol, 8–0 vs Malmö, 10–2 vs Rayo Vallecano and others). In the Copa del Rey round of 32, Real accidentally fielded an ineligible player, who was suspended from the previous season (when he was representing a different team), resulting in the team's controversial disqualification from the tournament by the competition judge despite protests from President Pérez. In the meantime, Real comfortably topped their UCL group with 16 points and a +16 goal difference. Benítez was relieved of his duties mid-season, following allegations of unpopularity with supporters, displeasure with players and a failure to get good results against top teams. Benítez's departure was announced along with the promotion of Zinedine Zidane to his first head coaching role. Under Zidane, Madrid managed to turn the odds in its favor, ultimately winning the Champions League, something no one expected. The notable results include a 2–1 away victory over reigning treble winners Barcelona, who were on a record-breaking winning streak, a fantastic comeback against Wolfsburg in the Champions League quarter-finals (after losing the away game 0–2, Madrid erased the deficit and won 3–0 at home, courtesy of a Cristiano Ronaldo hat-trick), as well as a 12-game winning streak to conclude the league campaign, meaning Real finished second, with 90 points and just one point behind champions Barcelona, coming agonizingly close to clinching the title and overcoming a 12-point deficit in the process. Finally, on 28 May, Real Madrid's eleventh Champions League title was won thanks to a 5–3 penalty shoot-out victory over rivals Atlético Madrid after a 1–1 draw in the final, with the achievement being termed "La Undécima". The season was the first since 1998–99 without Iker Casillas, who departed to Porto.

Season overview

Pre-season
La Décima winning coach Carlo Ancelotti left the club on 25 May 2015, after winning two out of possible six trophies in the 2014–15 season and narrowly missing out both on the league and Champions League titles. He was then replaced by Rafael Benítez on 3 June 2015.

Brazilian duo Casemiro and Danilo were bought from Porto for a fee of €7.5 million and €31.5 million respectively. Both signed long-term deals with the club, with Casemiro returning after Real Madrid exercised their buy-back clause option on the player. Spanish wingers Marco Asensio and Lucas Vázquez also joined the club, while Sami Khedira signed for Juventus after his contract was not renewed by the club. Javier Hernández soon departed back to Manchester United after Madrid did not make his season-long loan from the last campaign a permanent deal.

The contracts of Dani Carvajal, Marcelo and Sergio Ramos were renewed for another six years and were set to expire in the summer of 2020. Pepe extended his contract until 2017. Casemiro's contract was extended to 2021.

Iker Casillas left the club on 11 July 2015 and was transferred to Porto after 15 years with Los Blancos. Kiko Casilla was signed as a replacement on 17 July 2015.

The schedule of the season was announced on 14 July 2015.

On 18 August 2015, Mateo Kovačić was signed from Internazionale, while Marco Asensio was loaned to Espanyol.

August
Madrid started off their 2015–16 league campaign with a goalless draw at Sporting de Gijón.

Asier Illarramendi was sold to Real Sociedad on 26 August 2015, while Fábio Coentrão was loaned to Monaco and Lucas Silva to Marseille.

Madrid thrashed Real Betis in their home opener by a score of 5–0 after braces from Gareth Bale and James Rodríguez and a goal from Karim Benzema.

September
Cristiano Ronaldo scored five goals and had an assist for Benzema in a 6–0 away rout of Espanyol. With the five goals, Ronaldo set his Spanish league goal tally to 230 goals in 203 games, surpassing Raúl's record of 228 goals in 550 games for Real Madrid in La Liga, becoming the all-time top scorer for Real Madrid in the Spanish league.

Real started the 2015–16 UEFA Champions League season with a 4–0 home victory over Shakhtar Donetsk. Benzema scored the opener and Ronaldo had yet another hat-trick just four days after his last.

A lone goal by Benzema lifted Madrid over Granada to maintain their winning streak.

Benzema scored a brace to help Real record another victory at Athletic Bilbao.

Against Málaga, Madrid came out with a goalless draw.

October
Real visited Atlético Madrid in the first Madrid Derby of the season. Benzema gave Real the lead, but the game eventually ended in a 1–1 draw.

Ronaldo became the all-time top goalscorer for Real Madrid with a goal in a 3–0 victory over Levante. Marcelo and Jesé scored the other goals.

Madrid faced Paris Saint-Germain in the Champions League and came away with a goalless draw, which extended Madrid's unbeaten group stage streak to three years.

In the top match of the ninth round, against Celta de Vigo, Madrid came away with a 3–1 victory, thanks to goals from Ronaldo, Marcelo and Danilo (his first goal as a Real player).

Goals from Isco, Ronaldo and Jesé wrapped up the month of October up with a 3–1 home win over Las Palmas.

November
The new month started with a narrow 1–0 victory against Paris Saint-Germain, which saw Madrid going through to the round of 16 in the Champions League. The lone goal was scored by Nacho.

Goals from Sergio Ramos and James Rodríguez were not enough to get by Sevilla, as Real lost the game 2–3 and the lead position of the table.

After the international break, Real hosted arch-rivals Barcelona and suffered a 0–4 loss, their heaviest defeat in El Clásico since 0–5 in 2010.

Madrid secured the top spot of their Champions League group by defeating Shakhtar Donetsk 4–3 away after a brace from Ronaldo and goals from Luka Modrić and Dani Carvajal.

Goals from Bale and Ronaldo snapped a two-game losing streak in the league with a 2–0 victory over Eibar.

December
Madrid started the cup season in style with a 3–1 victory over Cádiz by a brace from Isco and a goal from Denis Cheryshev. The match was controversial, however, as Cheryshev was suspended from the previous season for three yellow cards (when he was representing a different team) but played the game nonetheless due to an accounting mistake by Madrid officials. Real was disqualified from the 2015–16 Copa del Rey two days later by the competition judge despite protests from President Pérez.

A brace from Benzema and goals from Bale and Ronaldo gave Madrid the edge to win 4–1 over Getafe.

Four goals from Ronaldo, a hat-trick from Benzema and a goal from Mateo Kovačić wrapped up the group stage of the Champions League with an 8–0 thrashing of Malmö FF.

Madrid had a rough awakening back in La Liga when they lost 0–1 at Villarreal.

A record 10–2 victory over Rayo Vallecano helped Madrid to secure the third spot in the league table with four goals from Bale, a hat-trick from Benzema, a Ronaldo brace and a goal from Danilo.

Two goals from Ronaldo and a goal from Lucas Vázquez secured a 3–1 victory against Real Sociedad to end the year.

January
The new year started with a 2–2 draw at Valencia, with goals from Benzema and Bale securing ten-man Real Madrid a point.

On 4 January 2016, it was announced that Benítez was sacked and replaced by former assistant coach Zinedine Zidane.

The Zidane era was opened with a 5–0 win over Deportivo de La Coruña thanks to a hat-trick by Bale and a brace from Benzema.

Gijón was defeated 5–1 with braces from Ronaldo and Benzema plus a Bale goal.

A goal from Benzema was not enough in a 1–1 draw against Betis.

Real then thrashed Espanyol 6–0, with Ronaldo scoring a hat-trick and Rodríguez and Benzema adding the other goals alongside an own goal.

February
Cheryshev was loaned out to Valencia on 1 February 2016.

A late goal from Modrić saved the 2–1 win against Granada, after Benzema opened the scoring.

A stunning Ronaldo brace and goals from Rodríguez and Toni Kroos gave Madrid a 4–2 victory over Bilbao.

Against Roma in the Champions League round of 16, Ronaldo and Jesé helped Zidane to get off to a good start in Europe with a 2–0 win.

Madrid managed to get a 1–1 draw at Málaga with the goal being scored by Ronaldo.

The home match against Atlético Madrid was lost 0–1 and the gap to the first place blew to 12 points.

March
The new month was opened with a 3–1 victory at Levante with goals from Ronaldo, Isco and an own goal.

Four goals from Ronaldo and goals by Pepe, Bale and Jesé secured Madrid a 7–1 win over Celta Vigo.

Goals from Ronaldo and Rodríguez secured a 2–0 win over Roma (aggregate 4–0) in the round of 16 of the Champions League.

Casemiro secured the three points with a late goal, after Ramos initially put Madrid in the lead in a 2–1 away victory over Las Palmas.

Goals from Benzema, Ronaldo, Bale and Jesé secured Los Blancos a 4–0 win over Sevilla.

April
El Clásico was won 2–1 away from home with a Benzema equalizer and a late winner from Ronaldo, snapping Barcelona's 39-game unbeaten streak. Madrid outplayed Barça despite having been reduced to ten men in the second half with a Ramos red card and having a goal ruled out for a non-existent foul by Bale.

The first leg of the quarter-finals at the Champions League was lost 0–2 away from home to VfL Wolfsburg.

Against Eibar, Madrid was able to get a 4–0 victory with goals from Rodríguez, Vázquez, Ronaldo and Jesé.

In the penultimate home leg against Wolfsburg, a perfect Ronaldo hat-trick propelled Madrid's comeback, with a 3–0 home win overturning the deficit and ensuring a 3–2 aggregate victory. The result also signified Madrid's progression to their sixth consecutive Champions League semi-finals.

Benzema, Isco, Bale, Rodríguez and Ronaldo gave Madrid a 5–1 victory at Getafe.

Goals from Benzema, Vázquez and Modrić secured Madrid the three points in a 3–0 win over Villarreal.

A brace from Bale and a goal from Vázquez gave Madrid a comeback win against Rayo Vallecano after being down 0–2.

The first leg of the Champions League semi-finals against Manchester City ended in a goalless draw.

A Bale header gave Madrid a late 1–0 win at Real Sociedad.

May

Fernando scored an own goal as Real Madrid progressed into the Champions League final by beating Manchester City, setting up a clash with neighbours Atlético Madrid for the second time in three years.

A brace from Ronaldo and a goal from Benzema secured a narrow 3–2 win over Valencia. With this win, Real moved up to second place in the league with a chance at the title.

Madrid won 2–0 at Deportivo thanks to another Ronaldo brace at the last matchday of the league. With that win, Madrid finished second, just a point behind league champions Barcelona, also producing a remarkable 12-game winning streak to conclude the campaign.

On 28 May 2016, Real Madrid's 11th Champions League title was won thanks to a 5–3 penalty shoot-out victory over Atlético Madrid after a 1–1 draw, with Ramos giving Real an early lead.

Kits
Supplier: Adidas / Sponsor: Fly Emirates

Players

Transfers

In

Total spending:  €83.5M

Out

Total income:  €15.65M
Net income:  €67.85M

Pre-season and friendlies

Competitions

Overall

Overview

La Liga

League table

Results summary

Results by round

Matches

Copa del Rey

Round of 32

UEFA Champions League

Group stage

Knockout phase

Round of 16

Quarter-finals

Semi-finals

Final

Statistics

Squad statistics

|}

Players who left the club during the season yet had made at least one appearance in competitive matches are in italics

Goals

Disciplinary record

References

External links

Real Madrid CF seasons
Real Madrid
Real Madrid
UEFA Champions League-winning seasons